The AK-630 is a Soviet and Russian fully automatic  naval, rotary cannon, close-in weapon system. The "630" designation refers to the weapon's six gun barrels and their 30 mm caliber.

The system is mounted in an enclosed automatic turret and directed by MR-123 radar and television detection and tracking. The weapon's primary purpose is defense against aircraft and helicopters. Effectiveness against anti-ship missiles and other precision-guided weapons is limited due to the limitations of the radar and aiming system and due to the dispersion of a short-barreled gun.

The AK-630 can also be employed against ships and other small craft, coastal targets, and floating mines. Once operational, the system was rapidly adopted and installed in every new Soviet warship (from mine-hunters to aircraft carriers) with up to eight units on larger vessels; hundreds have been produced in total.

Description

The complete weapon system is called A-213-Vympel-A, which comprises the AK-630M Gun Mount, MR-123-02 Fire Control Radar System, and SP-521 Electrical-Optical Tracker. A single MR-123 radar system can simultaneously control two guns, either two 30 mm gun mounts, or two 57 mm gun mounts, or one 30 mm gun and one 57 mm gun. The radar system can engage aerial and surface targets at  respectively. Features include surveillance and tracking modes, high jamming immunity, laser range finder and TV optical sight. It is in operation on almost all Russian Navy ships from fast attack boats to the Kirov battlecruiser.

The gun mount is fully automated, and can also be remotely controlled by an operator from either the control console or via a remotely mounted gunsight. It has a higher firing rate than both the Goalkeeper and Phalanx (Block 1 and older) CIWS models. They are often mounted in pairs, with as many as four pairs mounted on the larger ships, providing an effective point defence (last) layer. However, like all gun-based CIWS, they suffer from short engagement times and the need for multiple volleys to effectively eradicate a threat.

Development

The AK-630 CIWS is composed of several members and sometimes the Kashtan CIWS's sub-systems and its derivatives are also included.

AK-630

The design of the AK-630 CIWS was initiated in 1963, with the first operational prototype completed in 1964. Trials of the complete system, including radar and controls went on until 1976 when the system was accepted for service.

AK-630M
During the deployment of the system, numerous problems that did not appear in trials were exposed in its application, and some modification of the original AK-630 was made to correct these problems, and in 1979, the new system was named as AK-630M and was accepted into service.

AK-306
A derivative of AK-630M was developed for light craft and this system was named as AK-306.  Externally, the air-cooled AK-306 can be distinguished from the AK-630 by the absence of the water cooling system (a cylindrical jacket that surrounds the barrel cluster of the AK-630). Internally, the AK-306 (A-219) used electricity to power the automatics, instead of using the exhaust.  This version also lacked radar control, being only optically guided, hence making it less of an anti-missile weapon and more of a surface-to-surface weapon, and the designation of the overall system is consequently changed from A-213-Vympel-A to A-219.  The design started in 1974 and the system was accepted into service in 1980.  When production was completed in 1986, 125 systems were in service.

AK-630M1-2
In 1983, a decision was made to update the design and modify the AK-630 system to include a second gun mounted above the first, which provides 10,000 rpm in total. The AK-630M1-2 "Roy" was roughly the same size and weight allowing installation in existing AK-630 mounts. Though the system proved to be successful, the AK-630M1-2 Roy was not accepted for production due to the maturity of a combined missile and gun system, then designated the 3M87 Kortik, but later called Kashtan. The single example of AK-630M1-2 Roy remains installed on the Project 206.6 class missile boat # P-44.

AK-630M2
In July 2007 at IMDS-2007, a modernized version of the AK-630M1-2 called AK-630M2 with two AO-18KD rotary cannons was showcased by OAO AK Tulamashzavod under the new name "Duet". Visually "Duet" differs from "Roy" in having a new mount with a stealthy low RCS design compared with the more traditional rounded AK-630 mounts.

In 2012 it was announced that the new Ivan Gren-class landing ship would be armed with the modified AK-630M2 system. It is also used by the Buyan-M-class missile corvette.

H/PJ-13

H/PJ-13 is the Chinese upgraded version of AK-630M. The most obvious visual difference between AK-630 and its Chinese cousin H/PJ-13 is that the latter has a stealth turret. Instead of MP-123-02 fire control radar originally used on AK-630M, a modified version of Type 347 radar is used. The original electro-optical system of AK-630M is also replaced by domestic Chinese system ZGJ-1B, and the fire control system is replaced by domestic Chinese ZFJ-1A fire control system. To improve its anti-missile capability, Chinese have also developed APDS round for H/PJ-13 to supplement/replace the original high explosive round of the AK-630M.

Comparison with current CIWS

Operators

Current operators
 on Steregushchy-class corvette

Former operators

See also
AK-230
3K95 Kinzhal
Kashtan CIWS
List of Russian inventions

References
Notes

Citations

External links

English
AK-630M – Tulamashzavod website
30×165mm – Russian Ammunition Page
Russian
30 мм установка АК-630 – Military Russia
30 мм установка АК-630М1-2 / АК-630М-2 – Military Russia
30-мм АВТОМАТИЧЕСКАЯ УСТАНОВКА АК-630М1-2 «РОЙ» – Вестник ПВО
АК-630, корабельная автоматическая 30-мм артиллерийская шестиствольная установка  – Оружие России

30 mm artillery
Rotary cannon
Soviet inventions
Naval guns of Russia
Close-in weapon systems
Naval anti-aircraft guns
Anti-aircraft weapons of Russia
Cold War weapons of the Soviet Union
Anti-aircraft guns of the Soviet Union
KBP Instrument Design Bureau products
Tulamashzavod products
Military equipment introduced in the 1970s